Nadine Mohamed Sayed Soliman Mohamed (born January 21, 1998) is an Egyptian basketball player. She plays for the Al Ahly Sporting Club and the Egyptian national team.

Early life
Mohamed is the daughter of Mohamed and Iman Soliman. She attended Mokattam Language School in Cairo, Egypt and graduated with an academic award. She played college basketball for the University of North Carolina Greensboro Spartans women's basketball.

Professional career 
Mohamed is a member of the Egyptian national basketball team. She was named the U18 Al Ahly, while she led them to the 2016 Egyptian Cup. Mohamed was the seventh leading scorer in the World Cup that took place in Russia when she played for the Egyptian National Team during the 2014 U17 World Championships. Mohamed averaged 14.3 points and 4.0 rebounds while shooting 45 percent from the field. Mohamed also represented Egypt in the 2013 FIBA World Cup in Czech Republic and was the fourth-leading scorer in the 2013 African Championship.

Mohamed played in the Egyptian women basketball team at the 2021 Women's Afrobasket. She averaged 16.8 points, 4.7 rebounds and 1.7 assists.

References 

1998 births
Living people
Egyptian women's basketball players
Egyptian expatriate sportspeople in the United States
UNC Greensboro Spartans athletes
Egyptian expatriate basketball people in the United States